George Duffield (October 7, 1732February 2, 1790) was a leading eighteenth-century Presbyterian minister. He was born in Lancaster County, Province of Pennsylvania in 1732. In 1779, Duffield was elected a member of the American Philosophical Society.

Education and preparation for the ministry
George Duffield was first educated at Newark Academy in Delaware. He trained at the College of New Jersey (now Princeton), and graduated in 1752. He did personal study and ministerial preparation in theology with the guidance of Dr. Robert Smith, of Pequea, Pennsylvania. His ordination to Presbyterian ministry led him to serve three churches in central Pennsylvania in Carlisle, Newville, and Dillsburg.

Carlisle, Pennsylvania
Duffield moved to Carlisle, Pennsylvania in 1757, and ministered to multiple churches until 1772. He was known to be an ardent and animated preacher.  He married Margaret Armstrong, a daughter of Archibald Armstrong of Delaware and sister-in-law of General John Armstrong who was an elder in Duffield's church. Margaret Armstrong is often incorrectly cited as being a sister of John Armstrong.

Old Pine Street Presbyterian Church

He was called in 1771 to the Pine Street Presbyterian Church in Philadelphia. From the fall of 1772 until his death in 1790, he served as pastor at the Old Pine Street Presbyterian Church in Philadelphia. During the American Revolutionary War, he served as a chaplain of the Continental Congress.

Family
His grandson was George Duffield IV, also a Presbyterian minister; and his great-grandson was George Duffield V, the American Presbyterian minister and hymnodist, who was a pastor from 1840 to 1869 at numerous cities in Pennsylvania, New Jersey, New York, and Michigan; known for authoring Stand Up, Stand Up for Jesus.

References

External links
Presbyterian Heritage Center:Biography — The Reverend George Duffield (Oct. 7, 1732 - Feb. 2, 1790)

1732 births
1790 deaths
People from Lancaster County, Pennsylvania
People of colonial Pennsylvania
People of Pennsylvania in the American Revolution
Clergy in the American Revolution
Members of the American Philosophical Society
Presbyterian Church in the United States of America ministers